CloudMinds is an operator of cloud-based systems for cognitive robotics.

History 
CloudMinds, a company established in 2015, has developed a cloud-based intelligent robot architecture. SoftBank, Foxconn, Walden Venture Investments, and Keytone Ventures are its backers. Research in smart devices, robot control, high-speed security networks, and cloud intelligence integration has been developed by CloudMinds.

CloudMinds developed the Mobile Intranet Cloud Services (MCS) based on these technologies in order to increase the information security of the cloud robot remote control. The technology has been applied in the fields of finance, medicine, the military, public safety, and large-scale manufacturing.

U.S. sanctions 

In May 2020, CloudMinds was added to the Bureau of Industry and Security's Entity List due to U.S. national security concerns.

References

External links 

 

Companies based in Beijing
Companies based in San Francisco
Robotics companies of China
Robotics companies of the United States
Cloud computing
Technology companies established in 2015
Chinese companies established in 2015
American companies established in 2015
2015 establishments in California